Valeria Lvovna Kudryavtseva (Лера Кудрявцева; born May 19, 1971), best known as Lera Kudryavtseva, is a Kazakhstani-born Russian television presenter, actress, singer, and dancer.

Biography
Kudryavtseva was born in Ust-Kamenogorsk in 1971 in an ethnic Russian family. Although initially dreaming of a career as a doctor, Kudryavtseva enters the local cultural institute. While her sister moves to Moscow, Kurdyavtseva stays in her hometown and starts working at the local House of Culture, organising concerts. One of the concerts happens to be with the then popular boy band Laskovyi Mai. After marrying the band's drummer Sergei Lenyuk in 1990, Kudryavtseva starts working as a backing vocalist and dancer for several bands and artists, including Evgeny Osin. 

Moving to Moscow, Kudryavtseva starts studying at the Russian Academy of Theatre Arts. In 1995, Kudryavtseva passed a screen test to become the co-presenter of the programme Partiynaya zona on the small television station TV-6, alongside Igor Vernik. 

In 2002, she had her big breakthrough as a presenter, hosting the inaugrial edition of New Wave with Maksim Galkin. The broadcast became one the most watched television programme of the year 2002 in Russia. Kudryavtseva has hosted the competition every year since. 

Kudryavtseva also became one of the most well-known presenters on the Russian commercial television station NTV with programmes as Zvyozdy soslish'''. Next to that, she started presenting the programme Secret for a million'' in 2016, in which famous celebrities answer controversial questions about their own life to earn money for charity. 

Kudryavtseva has stated that her dream guest would be Russian President Vladimir Putin.

Personal life 

From 2004 until 2007 she was married to Matvei Morozov (born 1972).

She was in a relationship with musician Sergey Lazarev from 2008 to 2012. 

She is currently married to Igor Makarov (since June 2013), the couple had a daughter (born 2018).

References

External links 
 
 

1971 births
Living people
People from Oskemen
Russian television personalities
Russian Orthodox Christians from Russia
21st-century Russian singers
21st-century Russian women singers